Lisa Michelle Duncan was Miss California 1993 and won a swimsuit award at Miss America 1994.

References

Living people
Year of birth missing (living people)
People from California
Miss America 1994 delegates
Miss America Preliminary Swimsuit winners
20th-century American people